Markook bread, also known as khubz ruqaq, shrak, khubz rqeeq, mashrooh, and saj bread, is a kind of Middle Eastern unleavened flatbread common in the Levant and the Arabian peninsula. It is baked on a convex metal griddle (a saj) or in a tannour.

Markook shrak is a type of thin bread. The dough is unleavened and usually made with only flour, water, and salt, and after being rested and divided into round portions, flattened and spread across a round cushion until it is thin then flipped onto the saj. It is often folded and put in bags before being sold.

It is commonly compared to pita bread, also found in Middle Eastern cuisine, although it is much larger and thinner. In some Arab countries, such as Yemen, different names are given for the same flatbread, such as khamir, maluj and ṣaluf, depending on the regional dialects. By Israelis, markook may also be referred to as laffa, though markook and laffa are distinct types of flatbread.

Etymology
Markook comes from the Arabic word  meaning delicate, and  also comes from the verb .

History
Markook was also mentioned in the tenth-century cookbook of Ibn Sayyar al-Warraq under the name ruqaq. He describes it as large and paper-thin, unleavened bread.

German orientalist Gustaf Dalman described the markook in Palestine during the early 20th-century as being also the name applied to flatbread made in a tannour, although, in this case, it was sometimes made with leavening agents.

Gallery

See also

 Chapati
 Gözleme
 Lavash
 Khubz
 Naan
 Pita
 Piadina
 Pane carasau
 Rumali Roti
 Yufka, another bread called "saj bread"

References

   
 

Arab cuisine
Mediterranean cuisine
Levantine cuisine
Lebanese cuisine
Palestinian cuisine
Syrian cuisine
Jewish baked goods
Jewish breads
Jordanian cuisine
Iraqi cuisine
Israeli cuisine
Saudi Arabian cuisine
Emirati cuisine
Yemeni cuisine
Flatbreads